Thomas, Tom, or Tommy Cooper may refer to:

Arts and entertainment
Thomas Apthorpe Cooper (1776–1849), English actor
Thomas Sidney Cooper (1803–1902), English painter
Thomas Cooper (poet) (1805–1892), English poet and Chartist
Thomas Cooper de Leon (1839–1914), American journalist, author and playwright
Tommy Cooper (1921–1984), British magician and comedian
Thomas Joshua Cooper (born 1946), American landscape photographer

Military
Thomas Cooper (pilot) (1833–1906), American maritime pilot
Thomas Haller Cooper (1919–1987), member of the British Free Corps and convicted traitor
Thomas E. Cooper (born 1943), U.S. Assistant Secretary of the Air Force (Acquisition), 1983–87

Politics
Thomas Cooper (Parliamentarian) (died 1659), colonel in the Parliamentary Army and politician
Thomas Cooper (American politician, born 1759) (1759–1840), American educationalist and political philosopher, commonly associated with South Carolina
Thomas Cooper (American politician, born 1764) (1764–1829), U.S. congressman from Delaware
Thomas Buchecker Cooper (1823–1862), U.S. congressman from Pennsylvania
Thomas Valentine Cooper (1835–1909), American politician from Pennsylvania
Thomas Cooper, 1st Baron Cooper of Culross (1892–1955), Scottish politician, judge and historian

Sports
Tom Cooper (cyclist) (1874–1906), American racing cyclist and early automobile driver
Tom Cooper (footballer) (1904–1940), England international footballer
Tom Cooper (baseball) (1927–1985), American Negro league baseball player
Tom Cooper (cricketer) (born 1986), Netherlands and South Australia cricketer
Tom Cooper (rugby union) (born 1987), English rugby union player

Others
Thomas Cooper (bishop) (c. 1517–1594), English bishop of Lincoln and Winchester
Thomas Frederick Cooper (watchmaker) (1789–1863), English watchmaker 
Thomas Cooper (brewer) (1826–1897), founder of Coopers Brewery
Thomas Thornville Cooper (1839–1878), English traveller in China
Thomas Edwin Cooper (1874–1942), English architect

Other uses
Tommy Cooper: Not Like That, Like This, 2014 film